Vattapparapoyil is a small village in Narikkuni Grama Panchayath, Kerala, India. The Narikkuni to Pannoor Road is crossing this village.

References

Villages in Kozhikode district
Thamarassery area